Tunnel vision is the loss of peripheral vision

Tunnel vision or Tunnel Vision may also refer to:
 Tunnel vision (metaphor), the reluctance to consider alternatives to one's preferred line of thought
 Tunnel vision (marksmanship), when a shooter is focused on a target, and thus misses what goes on around that target

Music
 Tunnel Vision (album), a 2001 album by Tunnel Rats
 Tunnel Vision, a 2010 album by Stickman
 Tunnel Vision, a 2019 album by Bishop Lamont

 "Tunnel Vision" (Justin Timberlake song), 2013
 "Tunnel Vision" (Kodak Black song), 2017
 "Tunnel Vision" (Pop Smoke song), 2020
 "Tunnel Vision", a 1995 song by Lenny Kravitz from Circus
 "Tunnel Vision", a 2015 song by Rina Sawayama

Film and television
 Tunnel Vision (1976 film), a 1976 comedy film
 Tunnel Vision (1995 film), an Australian film
 "Tunnel Vision" (CSI: Miami), a 2008 episode of CSI: Miami

Other uses
 Tunnelvision, a 1975 mural by Blue Sky
 Tunnel Vision, a 2001 novel by Keith Lowe
 Tunnel Vision, a 2007 novel by Shandana Minhas
 Tunnel Vision: Trial & Error, a 2002 book by Robert O. Marshall